The Institute of Combinatorics and its Applications (ICA) is an international scientific organization formed in 1990 to increase the visibility and influence of the combinatorial community. In pursuit of this goal, the ICA sponsors  conferences, publishes a bulletin and awards a number of medals, including the Euler, Hall, Kirkman, and Stanton Medals. It is based in Duluth, Minnesota and its operation office is housed at University of Minnesota Duluth.
The institute was minimally active between 2010 and 2016 and resumed its full activities in March 2016.

Membership
The ICA has over 800 members in over forty countries. Membership is at three levels. Members are those who have not yet completed a Ph.D. Associate Fellows are younger members who have received the Ph.D. or have published extensively; normally an Associate Fellow should hold the rank of Assistant Professor. Fellows are expected to be established scholars and typically have the rank of Associate Professor or higher.
Some members are involved in highly theoretical research; there are members whose primary interest lies in education and instruction; and there are members who are heavily involved in the applications of combinatorics in statistical design, communications theory, cryptography, computer security, and other practical areas.

Although being a fellow of the ICA is not itself a highly selective honor, the ICA also maintains another class of members, "honorary fellows", people who have made "pre-eminent contributions to combinatorics or its applications". The number of living honorary fellows is limited to ten at any time. The deceased honorary fellows include 
H. S. M. Coxeter, Paul Erdős, Haim Hanani, Bernhard Neumann, D. H. Lehmer,
Leonard Carlitz, Robert Frucht, E. M. Wright, and Horst Sachs.
Living honorary fellows include
S. S. Shrikhande, C. R. Rao, G. J. Simmons, Vera Sós, Henry Gould, Carsten Thomassen, and Neil Robertson.

Publication

The ICA publishes the Bulletin of the ICA, a journal that combines publication of survey and research papers with news of members and accounts of future and past conferences. It appears three times a year, in January, May and September and usually consists of 128 pages.

Beginning in 2017, the research articles in the Bulletin have been made available on an open access basis.

Medals

The ICA awards the Euler Medals annually for distinguished career contributions to combinatorics by a member of the institute who is still active in research. It is named after the 18th century mathematician Leonhard Euler.

The ICA awards the Hall Medals, named after Marshall Hall, Jr., to recognize outstanding achievements by members who are not over age 40.

The ICA awards the Kirkman Medals, named after Thomas Kirkman, to recognize outstanding achievements by members who are within four years past their Ph.D.

The winners of the medals for the years between 2010 and 2015 were decided by the ICA Medals Committee between November 2016 and February 2017 after the ICA resumed its activities in 2016.

In 2016, the ICA voted to institute an ICA medal to be known as the Stanton Medal, named after Ralph Stanton, in recognition of substantial and sustained contributions, other than research, to promoting the discipline of combinatorics. The Stanton Medal honours significant lifetime contributions to promoting the discipline of combinatorics through advocacy, outreach, service, teaching and/or mentoring. At most one medal per year is to be awarded, typically to a Fellow of the ICA.

List of Euler Medal winners

List of Hall Medal winners

List of Kirkman Medal winners

List of Stanton Medal winners

References

External links
 Official Website

Mathematical societies
Organizations established in 1990
Organizations based in Winnipeg
Mathematics awards